In ten-dimensional geometry, a rectified 10-cube is a convex uniform 10-polytope, being a rectification of the regular 10-cube.

There are 10 rectifications of the 10-cube, with the zeroth being the 10-cube itself. Vertices of the rectified 10-cube are located at the edge-centers of the 10-cube. Vertices of the birectified 10-cube are located in the square face centers of the 10-cube. Vertices of the trirectified 10-cube are located in the cubic cell centers of the 10-cube. The others are more simply constructed relative to the 10-cube dual polytope, the 10-orthoplex.

These polytopes are part of a family 1023 uniform 10-polytopes with BC10 symmetry.

Rectified 10-cube

Alternate names
 Rectified dekeract (Acronym rade) (Jonathan Bowers)

Cartesian coordinates 
Cartesian coordinates for the vertices of a rectified 10-cube, centered at the origin, edge length  are all permutations of:
 (±1,±1,±1,±1,±1,±1,±1,±1,±1,0)

Images

Birectified 10-cube

Alternate names
 Birectified dekeract (Acronym brade) (Jonathan Bowers)

Cartesian coordinates 
Cartesian coordinates for the vertices of a birectified 10-cube, centered at the origin, edge length  are all permutations of:
 (±1,±1,±1,±1,±1,±1,±1,±1,0,0)

Images

Trirectified 10-cube

Alternate names
 Tririrectified dekeract (Acronym trade) (Jonathan Bowers)

Cartesian coordinates 
Cartesian coordinates for the vertices of a triirectified 10-cube, centered at the origin, edge length  are all permutations of:
 (±1,±1,±1,±1,±1,±1,±1,0,0,0)

Images

Quadrirectified 10-cube

Alternate names
 Quadrirectified dekeract
 Quadrirectified decacross (Acronym terade) (Jonathan Bowers)

Cartesian coordinates 
Cartesian coordinates for the vertices of a quadrirectified 10-cube, centered at the origin, edge length  are all permutations of:
 (±1,±1,±1,±1,±1,±1,0,0,0,0)

Images

Notes

References 
 H.S.M. Coxeter: 
 H.S.M. Coxeter, Regular Polytopes, 3rd Edition, Dover New York, 1973 
 Kaleidoscopes: Selected Writings of H.S.M. Coxeter, edited by F. Arthur Sherk, Peter McMullen, Anthony C. Thompson, Asia Ivic Weiss, Wiley-Interscience Publication, 1995,  
 (Paper 22) H.S.M. Coxeter, Regular and Semi Regular Polytopes I, [Math. Zeit. 46 (1940) 380–407, MR 2,10]
 (Paper 23) H.S.M. Coxeter, Regular and Semi-Regular Polytopes II, [Math. Zeit. 188 (1985) 559-591]
 (Paper 24) H.S.M. Coxeter, Regular and Semi-Regular Polytopes III, [Math. Zeit. 200 (1988) 3-45]
 Norman Johnson Uniform Polytopes, Manuscript (1991)
 N.W. Johnson: The Theory of Uniform Polytopes and Honeycombs, Ph.D. (1966)
  x3o3o3o3o3o3o3o3o4o - ka, o3x3o3o3o3o3o3o3o4o - rake, o3o3x3o3o3o3o3o3o4o - brake, o3o3o3x3o3o3o3o3o4o - trake, o3o3o3o3x3o3o3o3o4o - terake, o3o3o3o3o3x3o3o3o4o - terade, o3o3o3o3o3o3x3o3o4o - trade, o3o3o3o3o3o3o3x3o4o - brade, o3o3o3o3o3o3o3o3x4o - rade, o3o3o3o3o3o3o3o3o4x - deker

External links 
 Polytopes of Various Dimensions
 Multi-dimensional Glossary

10-polytopes